Renbaan Duindigt is a horse racing venue in Wassenaar, Netherlands. It opened its doors in 1906.

External links
Renbaan Duindigt (nl)

Horse racing venues
Sports venues in South Holland